John James Williams  (1 April 1948 – 29 October 2020), known universally as J. J. Williams, was a Welsh rugby union player who gained thirty caps for Wales as a winger. In his early career, Williams was a talented sprinter, later becoming a member of the Wales rugby team that won the Five Nations Championship in 1975, 1976, 1978 and 1979, including Grand Slam wins in 1976 and 1978.

Williams played for the Bridgend Ravens and Llanelli RFC in the 1970s. His time at Llanelli included a famous win against the All Blacks in 1972. He was a key try creator and scorer for the 1974 British Lions tour to South Africa. After his retirement in 1980, Williams became a pundit and commentator for BBC Cymru Wales and later a successful businessman. His son, Rhys, is a professional track and field athlete.

Career
Williams was born in Nantyffyllon and received his primary education at Maesteg Grammar School. He later moved on to the Cardiff College of Education, which was described as "a hotbed of sporting excellence". Williams was a talented track athlete, representing Wales in the Commonwealth Games in Edinburgh in 1970. He achieved a time of 10.6 seconds in the 100 metre heat and also competed in the 200 metres and 4 × 100 metres relay. He became Welsh sprint champion in 1971.

Williams initially played rugby for Bridgend before joining Llanelli RFC, for whom he played a total of 223 games in nine seasons.

He gained his first international cap in 1973 in a victory over France in Paris.  He was rated as one of the fastest wingers in the game, and scored 12 tries in 30 appearances for Wales. He went on two British and Irish Lions tours, playing in all four tests in South Africa in 1974 and in three tests in New Zealand in 1977. He played a major role in the 1974 'invincible' series against South Africa, scoring two tries in each of the second and third tests (in so doing becoming the first British and Irish Lion to score two tries in the same test match in the 20th Century), and earning the title "The Welsh Whippet", and a last-gasp try against Orange Free State to help preserve the Lions' unbeaten record.

Post retirement
Williams later ran a commercial and industrial painting company based in Pyle, near Bridgend. He also fronted a consortium which offered to take over the Millennium Stadium in Cardiff. All three of his children have represented Wales at track and field events. His son Rhys was the Welsh track record holder in the 400 metres hurdles (49.09) in 2005. In 2013 he helped to promote the Wales Abdominal Aortic Aneurysm Screening Programme 

He died on 29 October 2020 at the age of 72 from cancer. He is survived by his wife and three children.

Honours

Personal honours
 Appointed Member of the Order of the British Empire (MBE) in the 2013 New Year Honours "for services to Rugby and charitable services in Wales."
 Inducted into the Welsh Sports Hall of Fame in 2009

Team honours

Llanelli

WRU Challenge Cup
Winner (4): 1973, 1974, 1975, 1976
Snelling Sevens
Winner (2): 1973, 1979

Wales

Five Nations Championship
Winner (4): 1975, 1976, 1978, 1979
Grand Slam
Winner (2): 1976, 1978,
Triple Crown
Winner (3): 1976, 1978, 1979

British and Irish Lions
British and Irish Lions Series: 1974, 1977

References

External links
JJ Williams, left wing, BBC.co.uk

1948 births
2020 deaths
Athletes (track and field) at the 1970 British Commonwealth Games
Barbarian F.C. players
Bridgend RFC players
British & Irish Lions rugby union players from Wales
Commonwealth Games competitors for Wales
Llanelli RFC players
Maesteg RFC players
Members of the Order of the British Empire
Rugby union players from Maesteg
Rugby union wings
Wales international rugby union players
Welsh male sprinters
Welsh rugby union players